The men's individual normal hill competition of the 2017 Winter Universiade will be held at the Sunkar International Ski Jumping Complex in Almaty on February 1.

Results

References 

Men's Individual